The Minister of State for Foreign Affairs is a mid-level ministerial position in the Foreign, Commonwealth and Development Office of His Majesty's Government. The office was known as Minister of State for Europe and the Americas from 2010 to 2020. It was most recently merged into the office of Minister of State for the Pacific and the International Environment.

Responsibilities 
The Minister’s responsibilities include:

China and Northeast Asia
Southeast Asia
Australia, New Zealand and Pacific Islands
Indian Ocean
Economic security (including export controls)
Sanctions
Economics and evaluation (including the Chief Economist)
Regulatory and economic diplomacy
Technology and analysis

List of ministers

See also 
 Foreign, Commonwealth and Development Office
 Secretary of State for Foreign, Commonwealth and Development Affairs
 Minister of State for Europe
Parliamentary Under-Secretary of State for Foreign Affairs

References 

Lists of government ministers of the United Kingdom
Ministerial offices in the United Kingdom
Foreign, Commonwealth and Development Office
1943 establishments in the United Kingdom